The 1794 English cricket season was the 23rd in which matches have been awarded retrospective first-class cricket status and the eighth after the foundation of the Marylebone Cricket Club. The season saw 16 top-class matches played in the country.

Matches 
A total of 16 top-class matches were played during the season. These included matches played by teams from Kent, Middlesex and Surrey as well as Oldfield Cricket Club from Berkshire which played in five first-class matches, four of them against MCC.

First mentions
Cricket is first known to have been played in Shropshire in 1794. A number of players made first-class debuts, including:

References

Further reading
 
 
 
 

1794 in England
English cricket seasons in the 18th century